India International Convention and Expo Centre (IICC) is an under construction convention center in Sector 25, Dwarka, Delhi. Its development has been projected to cost around US$4 billion. The foundation stone for the project was laid by Indian Prime Minister Narendra Modi on 20 September 2018. The total area of the entire convention center is 300,000 m2. It is expected that after its completion, G20 summit 2023, which India hosts, will be held here. Once completed, it will be one of the India's and Asia's largest convention center by area.

References

Convention centres in India